8B or VIII-B may refer to :
 AV-8B Harrier II, an aircraft
 Stalag VIII-B, a notorious German Army prisoner of war camp near Lamsdorf
 Caribbean Star Airlines IATA airline designator
 8b/10b encoding or 6b/8b encoding, in telecommunications, eight bit words
 Bone morphogenetic protein 8b
 Van Biesbroeck 8b, a brown dwarf star
 WASP-8b, an extrasolar planet discovered in 2008
 GCR Class 8B, a class of 25 two-cylinder steam locomotives
 WNT8B, a protein that in humans is encoded by the WNT8B gene
 Boeing XF8B, a single-engine aircraft developed by Boeing
 PDE8B, is an enzyme that in humans is encoded by the PDE8B gene
 HAT-P-8b, an extrasolar planet
 Isotta Fraschini Tipo 8B, an Italian luxury car made between 1931 and 1934
 Boron-8 (8B), an isotope of boron

See also
B8 (disambiguation)